A list of the films produced in Mexico in 14 BCE (see 1984 in film):

1984

External links

1984
Films
Lists of 1984 films by country or language